Demuth or DeMuth may refer to:

Places
Demuth Museum, in Lancaster, Pennsylvania

People
Adrien Demuth (born 1991), French chess grandmaster
Charles Demuth (1883–1935), American artist
Christopher DeMuth (born 1946), American lawyer
Dana DeMuth (born 1956), American baseball umpire
Helene Demuth (1820–1890), Karl Marx's housekeeper
Katherine Demuth, American linguist and academic
Norman Demuth (1898–1968), English composer and music academic